Istgah-e Keshvar (also Romanized as Īstgāh-e Keshvar; also known as Keshvar and Keshwar) is a village in Keshvar Rural District, Papi District, Khorramabad County, Lorestan Province, Iran. At the 2006 census, its population was 214, in 52 families.

References 

Towns and villages in Khorramabad County